The Rambler is the 56th album by American country singer Johnny Cash, released in 1977 on Columbia Records. A concept album about travelling, its songs, in between, include dialogue between Cash and hitchhikers picked up or other people he meets during the album's cross-country trip. It is the last, and one of the few Johnny Cash albums to only feature songs written by Cash himself. It is also his last non-religious concept album, and was included on the Bear Family box set Come Along and Ride This Train. The Rambler reached #31 on the country album charts; the two singles, "Lady" and "After the Ball", had minor chart success.

Track listing
All songs by Johnny Cash

Personnel
Johnny Cash - vocals, guitar
Bob Wootton, Jerry Hensley - electric guitar
Ray Edenton, Jack Routh - flat top guitar
Marshall Grant - bass guitar
W.S. Holland - drums
Earl Ball - piano
Mark Morris - percussion
Michael Bacon - cello
Cam Mullins - string arrangements
Written and directed by Johnny Cash
Technical
Charlie Bragg, Jack Routh, Johnny Cash - producer
Charlie Bragg, Chuck Bragg, Ed Hudson, Roger Tucker - engineer
Jerry Baker - recording
John Berg, Johnny Cash - photography

Actors
Johnny Cash - The Rambler
Jack Routh - The Fisherman
Kathleen Brimm - The Cowgirl
Carlene Routh, Rosanne Cash - Bargirls

Charts
Album - Billboard (United States)

Singles - Billboard (United States)

References

External links
Luma Electronic entry on The Rambler

Johnny Cash albums
1977 albums
Columbia Records albums
Concept albums